was a short-lived province in Hokkaidō.  It corresponded to modern-day Tokachi Subprefecture.

History
In 1820, the explorer Takeshiro Matsuura (松浦 武四郎) proposed Tokachi as the name of the province. The province was named after the Tokachi River, which in turn was derived from the Ainu language word "tokapci".

Although the exact origins of "tokapci" were unknown, Hidezo Yamada, an Ainu language researcher, proposed these origins:

 tokap-usi ("breast, somewhere")
 toka-o-pci ("swamp, around a place, either")

After 1869, the northern Japanese island was known as Hokkaido; and regional administrative subdivisions were identified, including Tokachi Province.
August 15, 1869 Tokachi Province established with 7 districts
1872 Census finds a population of 1,464
1882 Provinces dissolved in Hokkaidō

Districts
Hiroo (広尾郡)
Tōbui (当縁郡) - dissolved April 1, 1906 when 3 villages merged into Moyori Village (now Hiroo Town) in Hirō District and two villages merged with Ōtsu Village in Tokachi District
Kamikawa (上川郡)
Nakagawa (中川郡)
Katō (河東郡)
Kasai (河西郡)
Tokachi (十勝郡)

Notes

References
 Nussbaum, Louis-Frédéric and Käthe Roth. (2005).  Japan encyclopedia. Cambridge: Harvard University Press. ;  OCLC 58053128

Former provinces of Japan